The Generation of Columbuses is a term denoting the generation of Poles who were born soon after Poland regained its independence in 1918, and whose adolescence was marked by World War II. 

The term itself was coined by Roman Bratny in his 1957 novel Kolumbowie. Rocznik 20 and was itself based on the name of Christopher Columbus, as Bratny described the entire generation as the ones who "discovered Poland". The term is generally applied to young intelligentsia, but it also includes all young people who, instead of living a traditional young adulthood, had to fight against foreign occupation and study at secret universities.

Notable people 
Among the notable people commonly associated with the generation are:

 Krzysztof Kamil Baczyński, a catastrophist poet who was killed in the Warsaw Uprising
 Władysław Bartoszewski
 Miron Białoszewski, a poet and a writer
 Teresa Bogusławska, a poet, arrested by the Gestapo and imprisoned in the Pawiak, she died of meningitis in 1945
 Wacław Bojarski, a wartime poet and journalist of underground newspapers, died 1943
 Tadeusz Borowski, a poet and writer who survived Auschwitz-Birkenau and the Dachau concentration camp only to commit suicide in 1951
 Roman Bratny, writer
 Olgierd Budrewicz, journalist and Varsavianist
 Jerzy Ficowski, poet, journalist and ethnologist, pioneer of research on post-war Jewish and Gypsy life in Poland
 Tadeusz Gajcy, a poet, killed in the Warsaw Uprising
 Stanisław Grzesiuk
 Zbigniew Herbert
 Gustaw Herling-Grudziński
 Krystyna Krahelska, a girl-guide, poet and singer, model for the monument of the Warsaw's Siren, killed in the Warsaw Uprising
 Stanisław Lem
 Stanislas Likiernik
 Wojciech Mencel, a poet killed in the Warsaw Uprising
 Włodzimierz Pietrzak, an art critic and author, killed in the Warsaw Uprising
 Jan Romocki, a scouting instructor and poet, died in the Warsaw Uprising
 Tadeusz Różewicz
 Stanisław Staszewski
 Zdzisław Stroiński, a poet killed in the Warsaw Uprising
 Andrzej Trzebiński, a dramatist, novelist and a poet, arrested by the Germans and shot to death in 1943
 Józef Szczepański, a poet killed in the Warsaw Uprising
 Andrzej Szczypiorski
 Pope John Paul II

References
 Marcel Cornis-Pope, John Neubauer, History of the Literary Cultures of East-Central Europe, John Benjamins Publishing Company, 2004, Print, p.146
 Bolesław Klimaszewski, An Outline History of Polish Culture, Interpress, 1984, Print, p.343
 Marek Haltof, Polish National Cinema, Berghahn Books, 2002, Print, p.76
 Stanislas Likiernik "By devil's luck" Google
 Stanislas Likiernik interviewed by Emil Marat and Michal Wojcik "Made in Poland" wielkalitera.pl

See also
Polish culture during World War II

Demographic history of Poland
Polish culture
Poland in World War II
Polish People's Republic